Saint Joseph's Hawks basketball may refer to either of the basketball teams that represent Saint Joseph's University:
Saint Joseph's Hawks men's basketball
Saint Joseph's Hawks women's basketball